Tenofovir alafenamide, sold under the brand name Vemlidy, is a hepatitis B virus (HBV) nucleotide reverse transcriptase inhibitor medication for the treatment of chronic hepatitis B virus (HBV) infection in adults with compensated liver disease. It is taken by mouth.

Tenofovir alafenamide is a prodrug of tenofovir. It was developed by Gilead Sciences based on the protide technology of Chris McGuigan for use in the treatment of HIV/AIDS and chronic hepatitis B, and is applied in the form of tenofovir alafenamide fumarate (TAF). Closely related to the commonly used reverse-transcriptase inhibitor tenofovir disoproxil fumarate (TDF), TAF has greater antiviral activity and better distribution into lymphoid tissues than that agent. Vemlidy was approved by the U.S. Food and Drug Administration (FDA) in November 2016.

Fixed-dose combinations containing tenofovir alafenamide 

 Elvitegravir/cobicistat/emtricitabine/tenofovir alafenamide (Genvoya) — approved both in the United States and in the European Union in November 2015 (compare elvitegravir/cobicistat/emtricitabine/tenofovir; (Stribild))
 Emtricitabine/rilpivirine/tenofovir alafenamide (Odefsey) — approved in the United States in March 2016, and in the European Union in June 2016 (compare Emtricitabine/rilpivirine/tenofovir; (Complera))
 Emtricitabine/tenofovir alafenamide (Descovy) — approved in the United States in April 2016 (compare emtricitabine/tenofovir; (Truvada)). In October 2019, Descovy was approved in the United States for HIV-1 pre-exposure prophylaxis (PrEP).
 Bictegravir/emtricitabine/tenofovir alafenamide (Biktarvy) — approved in the United States in February 2018.
 Darunavir/cobicistat/emtricitabine/tenofovir alafenamide (Symtuza) — approved in the European Union in September 2017, in the United States in July 2018, and in Australia in November 2019.
 Dolutegravir/emtricitabine/tenofovir alafenamide.
 Dolutegravir/lamivudine/tenofovir alafenamide.

Research 
Gilead announced a Phase III clinical trial evaluating a single-tablet regimen combining tenofovir alafenamide with cobicistat, emtricitabine and elvitegravir and developed a coformulation of the drug with cobicistat, emtricitabine and the protease inhibitor darunavir.  In a 48-week study comparing elvitegravir/cobicistat/emtricitabine/tenofovir disoproxil (Stribild) to elvitegravir/cobicistat/emtricitabine/tenofovir alafenamide (Genvoya), the results showed the newer drug's effects to be non-inferior to the established agent, but at much lower dosages and with lower incidence of adverse side effects such as impaired kidney function. The FDA approved the TAF-based treatment regimen for treatment of HIV-1 in November 2015. Genvoya is the first TAF-based regimen to receive approval.

References

External links 
 
 

Carboxylate esters
Fixed dose combination (antiretroviral)
Gilead Sciences
Isopropyl esters
Nucleoside analog reverse transcriptase inhibitors
Organophosphates
Phenol esters
Pre-exposure prophylaxis